China National Highway 336 (G336) runs from Tianjin to Shenmu, Shaanxi.

See also 
 China National Highways

References 

Transport in Tianjin
Transport in Hebei
Transport in Shaanxi
Transport in Shanxi
National Highways in China